The Mandate for Syria and the Lebanon (1923−1946) was a League of Nations mandate founded in the aftermath of the First World War and the partitioning of the Ottoman Empire, concerning Syria and Lebanon. The mandate system was supposed to differ from colonialism, with the governing country intended to act as a trustee until the inhabitants were considered eligible for self-government. At that point, the mandate would terminate and an independent state would be born.

During the two years that followed the end of the war in 1918 -and in accordance with the Sykes–Picot Agreement signed by Britain and France during the war- the British held control of most of Ottoman Mesopotamia (modern Iraq) and the southern part of Ottoman Syria (Palestine and Transjordan), while the French controlled the rest of Ottoman Syria, Lebanon, Alexandretta (Hatay) and portions of southeastern Turkey. In the early 1920s, British and French control of these territories became formalized by the League of Nations' mandate system. And on 29 September 1923 France was assigned the League of Nations mandate of Syria, which included the territory of present-day Lebanon and Alexandretta in addition to modern Syria.

The administration of the region under the French was carried out through a number of different governments and territories, including the Syrian Federation (1922–24), the State of Syria (1924–30) and the Syrian Republic (1930–1950), as well as smaller states: the State of Greater Lebanon, the Alawite State and Jabal Druze State. Hatay State was annexed by Turkey in 1939. The French mandate lasted until 1946, when French troops eventually left Syria and Lebanon, which had both declared independence during World War II.

Background

With the defeat of the Ottomans in Syria, British troops, under General Sir Edmund Allenby, entered Damascus in 1918 accompanied by troops of the Arab Revolt led by Faisal, son of Sharif Hussein of Mecca. Faisal established the first new postwar Arab government in Damascus in October 1918, and named Ali Rida Pasha ar-Rikabi a military governor.

The new Arab administration formed local governments in the major Syrian cities, and the pan-Arab flag was raised all over Syria. The Arabs hoped, with faith in earlier British promises, that the new Arab state would include all the Arab lands stretching from Aleppo in northern Syria to Aden in southern Yemen.

However, in accordance with the secret Sykes–Picot Agreement between Britain and France, General Allenby assigned to the Arab administration only the interior regions of Syria (the eastern zone). Palestine (the southern zone) was reserved for the British. On 8 October, French troops disembarked in Beirut and occupied the Lebanese coastal region south to Naqoura (the western zone), replacing British troops there. The French immediately dissolved the local Arab governments in the region.

France demanded full implementation of the Sykes–Picot Agreement, with Syria under its control. On 26 November 1919, British forces withdrew from Damascus to avoid confrontation with the French, leaving the Arab government to face France. Faisal had travelled several times to Europe since November 1918, trying to convince France and Britain to change their positions, but without success. France's determination to intervene in Syria was shown by the naming of General Henri Gouraud as high commissioner in Syria and Cilicia. At the Paris Peace Conference, Faisal found himself in an even weaker position when the European powers decided to renege on the promises made to the Arabs.

In May 1919, elections were held for the Syrian National Congress, which convened in Damascus. 80% of seats went to conservatives. However, the minority included dynamic Arab nationalist figures such as Jamil Mardam Bey, Shukri al-Kuwatli, Ahmad al-Qadri, Ibrahim Hanano, and Riyad as-Solh. The head was moderate nationalist Hashim al-Atassi.

In June 1919, the American King–Crane Commission arrived in Syria to inquire into local public opinion about the future of the country. The commission's remit extended from Aleppo to Beersheba. They visited 36 major cities, met with more than 2,000 delegations from more than 300 villages, and received more than 3,000 petitions. Their conclusions confirmed the opposition of Syrians to the mandate in their country as well as to the Balfour Declaration, and their demand for a unified Greater Syria encompassing Palestine. The conclusions of the commission were ignored by both Britain and France.

Unrest erupted in Syria when Faisal accepted a compromise with French Prime Minister Clemenceau. Anti-Hashemite demonstrations broke out, and Muslim inhabitants in and around Mount Lebanon revolted in fear of being incorporated into a new, mainly Christian, state of Greater Lebanon. A part of France's claim to these territories in the Levant was that France had been acknowledged as a protector of the minority Christian communities by the Ottoman Empire.

In March 1920, the Congress in Damascus adopted a resolution rejecting the Faisal-Clemenceau accords. The congress declared the independence of Syria in her natural borders (including Southern Syria or Palestine), and proclaimed Faisal the king of all Arabs. Faisal invited Ali Rida al-Rikabi to form a government. The congress also proclaimed political and economic union with neighboring Iraq and demanded its independence as well.

On 25 April, the supreme inter-Allied council, which was formulating the Treaty of Sèvres, granted France the mandate of Syria (including Lebanon), and granted Britain the Mandate of Palestine (including Jordan), and Iraq. Syrians reacted with violent demonstrations, and a new government headed by Hashim al-Atassi was formed on 7 May 1920. The new government decided to organize general conscription and began forming an army.

These decisions provoked adverse reactions by France as well as by the Maronite patriarchate of Mount Lebanon, which denounced the decisions as a "coup d'état". In Beirut, the Christian press expressed its hostility to the decisions of Faisal's government. Lebanese nationalists used the crisis against Faisal's government to convene a council of Christian figures in Baabda that proclaimed the independence of Lebanon on 22 March 1920.

On 14 July 1920, General Gouraud issued an ultimatum to Faisal, giving him the choice between submission or abdication. Realizing that the power balance was not in his favor, Faisal chose to cooperate. However, the young minister of war, Youssef al-Azmeh, refused to comply. In the resulting Franco-Syrian War, Syrian troops under al-Azmeh, composed of the little remaining troops of the Arab army along with Bedouin horsemen and civilian volunteers, met the better trained 12,000-strong French forces under General Mariano Goybet at the Battle of Maysaloun. The French won the battle in less than a day and Azmeh died on the battlefield, along with many of the Syrian troops, while the remaining troops possibly defected. General Goybet captured Damascus with little resistance on 24 July 1920, and the mandate was written in London two years later on 24 July 1922.

States created during the French Mandate

Arriving in Lebanon, the French were received as liberators by the Christian community, but in the rest of Syria, they were faced with strong resistance.

The mandate region was subdivided into six states. They were the states of Damascus (1920), Aleppo (1920), Alawites (1920), Jabal Druze (1921), the autonomous Sanjak of Alexandretta (1921, modern-day Hatay), and the State of Greater Lebanon (1920), which became later the modern country of Lebanon.

The borders of these states were based in part on the sectarian geography in Syria. Many of the different Syrian sects were hostile to the French mandate and to the division it created, as shown by the numerous revolts that the French encountered in all of the Syrian states. The Maronite Christians of Mount Lebanon, on the other hand, were a community with a dream of independence that was being realized under the French. Therefore, Greater Lebanon was the exception among the newly formed states.

It took France three years from 1920 to 1923 to gain full control over Syria and to quell all the insurgencies that broke out, notably in the Alawite territories, Mount Druze and Aleppo.

Although there were uprisings in the different states, the French deliberately gave different ethnic and religious groups in the Levant their own lands in the hopes of prolonging their rule. The French hoped to fragment the various groups in the region, to mitigate support for the Syrian nationalist movement seeking to end colonial rule. The administration of the state governments was heavily dominated by the French. Local authorities were given very little power and did not have the authority to independently decide policy. The small amount of power that local leaders had could easily be overruled by French officials. The French did everything in their power to prevent people in the Levant from developing self-sufficient governing bodies.

State of Greater Lebanon

On 3 August 1920, Arrêté 299 of the Haut-commissariat de la République française en Syrie et au Liban linked the cazas of Hasbaya, Rachaya, Maallaka and Baalbeck to what was then known as the Autonomous Territory of Lebanon. Then on 31 August 1920, General Gouraud signed Arrêté 318 delimiting the State of Greater Lebanon, with explanatory notes stating that Lebanon would be treated separately from the rest of Syria. On 1 September 1920, General Gouraud publicly proclaimed the creation of the State of Greater Lebanon at a ceremony in Beirut.

Greater Lebanon was created by France to be a "safe haven" for the Maronite population of the mutasarrifia (Ottoman administrative unit) of Mount Lebanon. Mt. Lebanon, an area with a Maronite majority, had enjoyed varying degrees of autonomy during the Ottoman era. However, in addition to the Maronite Mutasarrifia other, mainly Muslim, regions were added, forming "Greater" Lebanon. Those regions correspond today to North Lebanon, South Lebanon, Biqa' valley, and Beirut. The capital of Greater Lebanon was Beirut. The new state was granted a flag, merging the French flag with the cedar of Lebanon.
Maronites were the majority in Lebanon and managed to preserve its independence; an independence that created a unique precedent in the Arab world, as Lebanon was the first Arab country in which Christians were not a minority. The State of Greater Lebanon existed until 23 May 1926, after which it became the Lebanese Republic.

Most Muslims in Greater Lebanon rejected the new state upon its creation. Some believe that the continuous Muslim demand for reunification with Syria eventually brought about an armed conflict between Muslims and Christians in 1958 when Lebanese Muslims wanted to join the newly proclaimed United Arab Republic, while Lebanese Christians were strongly opposed. However, most members of the Lebanese Muslim communities and their political elites were committed to the idea of being Lebanese citizens by the late 1930s, even though they also tended to nurture Arab nationalist sentiments.

State of Alawites

On 19 August 1920, General Gouraud signed Arrêté 314 which added to the autonomous sandjak of Alexandretta the cazas of Jisr el-Choughour, the madriyehs of Baher and Bujack (caza of Latakia), the moudiriyeh of Kinsaba (caza of Sahyoun) "with a view to the formation of the territories of Greater Lebanon and the Ansarieh Mountains"; where the "Ansarieh Mountains" area was to become the Alawite State. On 31 August 1920, the same day that the decree creating Greater Lebanon was signed, General Gouraud signed Arrêté 319 delimiting the State of Alawites, and Arrêté 317 adding the caza of Massyaf (Omranie) into the new State.

The State of Alawites was located on the Syrian coast and incorporated a majority of Alawites, a branch of Shia Islam. The port city of Latakia was the capital of this state. Initially it was an autonomous territory under French rule known as the "Alawite Territories". It became part of the Syrian Federation in 1922, but left the federation again in 1924 and became the "State of Alawites". On 22 September 1930, it was renamed the "Independent Government of Latakia". The population at this time was 278,000. The government of Latakia finally joined the Syrian Republic on 5 December 1936. This state witnessed several rebellions against the French, including that of Salih al-Ali (1918–1920).

On 28 June 1922 Arrêté 1459 created a "Federation of the Autonomous States of Syria" which included the State of Aleppo, the State of Damascus and the State of the Alawis. However, two and a half years later on 5 December 1924 Arrêté 2979 and Arrêté 2980 establishing the Alawite State as an independent state with Latakia as its capital, and separately unified the States of Aleppo and Damascus as from 1 January 1925 into a single State, renamed "d'État de Syrie" ("State of Syria").

In 1936, both Jebel Druze and the Alawite State were incorporated into the State of Syria.

State of Syria

On 1 September 1920, the day after the creation of Greater Lebanon and the Alawite State, Arrêté 330 separated out of the previous "Gouvernement de Damas" ("Government of Damascus") an independent government known as the "Gouvernement d'Alep" ("Government of Aleppo"), including the autonomous sandjak of Alexandretta, which retained its administrative autonomy. The terms "Gouvernement d'Alep" "Gouvernement de Damas" were used interchangeably with "l'État d'Alep" and "l'État de Damas" – for example, Arrete 279 1 October 1920 stated in its preamble: "Vu l'arrêté No 330 du 1er Septembre 1920 créant l'État d'Alep".

The State of Aleppo (1920–1925) included a majority of Sunni Muslims. It covered northern Syria in addition to the entire fertile basin of river Euphrates of eastern Syria. These regions represented much of the agricultural and mineral wealth of Syria. The autonomous Sanjak of Alexandretta was added to the state of Aleppo in 1923. The capital was the northern city of Aleppo, which had large Christian and Jewish communities in addition to the Sunni Muslims. The state also incorporated minorities of Shiites and Alawites. Ethnic Kurds and Assyrians inhabited the eastern regions alongside the Arabs. The General Governors of the state were Kamil Pasha al-Qudsi (1920–1922) Mustafa Bey Barmada (1923) and Mar'i Pasha Al Mallah (1924-1925).

The State of Damascus was a French mandate from 1920 to 1925. The capital was Damascus.

The primarily Sunni population of the states of Aleppo and Damascus were strongly opposed to the division of Syria. This resulted in its quick end in 1925, when France united the states of Aleppo and Damascus into the State of Syria.

Sanjak of Alexandretta

The Sanjak of Alexandretta became an autonomous province of Syria under Article 7 of the French-Turkish treaty of 20 October 1921: "A special administrative regime shall be established for the district of Alexandretta. The Turkish inhabitants of this district shall enjoy facility for their cultural development. The Turkish language shall have official recognition".

In 1923, Alexandretta was attached to the State of Aleppo, and in 1925 it was directly attached to the French mandate of Syria, still with special administrative status. The sanjak was given autonomy in November 1937 in an arrangement brokered by the League. Under its new statute, the sanjak became 'distinct but not separated' from the French Mandate of Syria on the diplomatic level, linked to both France and Turkey for defence matters.

In 1938, the Turkish military went into the Syrian province and expelled most of its Alawite Arab and Armenian inhabitants. Before this, Alawi Arabs and Armenians were the majority of Alexandretta's population.

The allocation of seats in the sanjak assembly was based on the 1938 census held by the French authorities under international supervision. The assembly was appointed in the summer of 1938, and the French-Turkish treaty settling the status of the Sanjak was signed on 4 July 1938.

On 2 September 1938, the assembly proclaimed the Sanjak of Alexandretta as the Hatay State. The republic lasted for one year under joint French and Turkish military supervision. The name Hatay itself was proposed by Atatürk and the government was under Turkish control.
In 1939, following a popular referendum, the Hatay State became a Turkish province.

State of Jabal Druze

On 24 October 1922, Arrêté 1641 established the "" ("Autonomous State of Jabal Druze")

It was created for the Druze population of southern Syria. It had a population of some 50,000 and its capital in As-Suwayda.

In 1936, both Jebel Druze and the Alawite State were incorporated into the State of Syria.

Demands for autonomy not granted by the French Mandate authorities

Al-Jazira Province

In 1936–1937, there was some autonomist agitation among Assyrians and Kurds, supported by some Bedouins, in the province of Al-Jazira. Its partisans wanted the French troops to stay in the province in the event of a Syrian independence, as they feared the nationalist Damascus government would replace minority officials by Muslim Arabs from the capital. The French authorities refused to consider any new status of autonomy inside Syria.

Golan Region
In Quneitra and the Golan Region, there was a sizeable Circassian community. For the same reasons as their Assyrian, Kurdish and Bedouin counterparts in Al-Jazira province in 1936–1937, several Circassian leaders wanted a special autonomy status for their region in 1938, as they feared the prospect of living in an independent Syrian republic under a nationalist Arab government hostile towards the minorities. They also wanted the Golan region to become a national homeland for Circassian refugees from the Caucasus. A Circassian battalion served in the French Army of the Levant and had helped it against the Arab nationalist uprisings. As in Al-Jazira Province, the French authorities refused to grant any autonomy status to the Golan Circassians.

Economy 

Already in 1921, the French wanted to develop the agricultural sector and over a feasibility study of the Union Economique de Syrie the North-East Syrian and the Alawite State were deemed profitable for the cotton cultivation. Investments began in 1924, but it took until the 1930s to produce more than the level reached in 1925. By 1933, Palestine was the largest importer of Syrian goods, while the French held a share of 7.5% of the imports. Between the two World Wars, France became the largest trader of goods of the French Mandate. From 1933 onwards, Japan was also a large source for imports.

Kingdom of Syria (1918-1920)

Heads of Government

King

French Mandate of Syria (1920-1939)

Acting Heads of State

President

Heads of State

Presidents

High Commissioners

 26 Nov 1919 – 23 Nov 1922: Henri Gouraud
 23 Nov 1922 – 17 Apr 1923: Robert de Caix (acting)
 19 Apr 1923 – 29 Nov 1924: Maxime Weygand
 29 Nov 1924 – 23 Dec 1925: Maurice Sarrail
 23 Dec 1925 – 23 Jun 1926: Henry de Jouvenel
 Aug 1926 – 16 Jul 1933: Auguste Henri Ponsot
 16 Jul 1933 – Jan 1939: Damien de Martel
 Jan 1939 – Nov 1940: Gabriel Puaux
 24 Nov 1940 – 27 Nov 1940: Jean Chiappe (died on flight to take office)
 6 Dec 1940 – 16 Jun 1941: Henri Dentz
 24 Jun 1941 – 7 Jun 1943: Georges Catroux
 7 Jun 1943 – 23 Nov 1943: Jean Helleu
 23 Nov 1943 – 23 Jan 1944: Yves Chataigneau
 23 Jan 1944 – 1 Sep 1946: Étienne Paul-Émile-Marie Beynet

See also

 French colonial empire
 French colonial flags
 French Lebanese
 List of French possessions and colonies
 Modern history of Syria

Notes

Further reading

Primary sources
 Haut-commissariat de la République française en Syrie et au Liban, Recueil des actes administratifs du Haut-commissariat de la République française en Syrie et au Liban, Bibliothèque numérique patrimoniale, Aix-Marseille University
 Haut-commissariat de la République française en Syrie et au Liban, Bulletin officiel des actes administratifs du Haut commissariat de la République française en Syrie et au Liban, Bibliothèque numérique patrimoniale, Aix-Marseille University

Secondary sources
 Hakim, Carol. 2019. "The French Mandate in Lebanon." The American Historical Review, Volume 124, Issue 5, Pages 1689–1693
 Hyam Mallat (2012), Comprendre la formation des États du Liban et la Syrie a l’aune des boulerversements actuels dans le monde arabe (in French)
 Hourani (1946), Syria and Lebanon: A Political Essay, page 180 onwards

External links

 Timeline of the French Mandate period
 Mandat Syria-Liban ... (1920–1946)

 
League of Nations mandates
20th century in Lebanon
20th century in Syria
History of the Levant
Former countries in the Middle East
Former colonies in Asia
Mandate for Syria
Mandate for Syria
Former countries of the interwar period
Political entities in the Land of Israel
Sykes–Picot Agreement
 
 
 
 
States and territories established in 1923
States and territories disestablished in 1946
 
1946 disestablishments in Asia
1923 establishments in the French colonial empire
1946 disestablishments in the French colonial empire
France–Lebanon relations
France–Syria relations